Tuesday (rendered as Tu£sday) is a low-budget 2008 British heist film set in the 1980s. Directed by Sacha Bennett, it stars John Simm, Philip Glenister, Ashley Walters and Kevin McNally as jewel thieves. The film was released in the United Kingdom on 10 October 2008.

Synopsis
The plot revolves around a jewel heist, where by coincidence three groups of thieves; four experienced criminals, two beautiful bank clerks and one desperate penniless man nearing retirement, try to steal a large emerald in the bank's safe on the same day. The film unfolds in a series of flashbacks from each of the characters’ perspectives, revealed by the suspects through a series of police interrogations. Two detectives must piece together seemingly unrelated people and clues and determine who really stole the Meidan-i-Noor – an emerald the size of a fist.

Cast
 Philip Glenister as Earp
 John Simm as Silver
 Ashley Walters as Billy
 Cristian Solimeno as Butch
 Kevin McNally as Jerry
 Dylan Brown as Thomas
 Kate Magowan as Angie
 Kirsty Mitchell as Samantha
 Alex Macqueen as Mr. Jacobs
 Linal Haft as William

Production
The film was written, produced and directed by Sacha Bennett. Some members of Tuesdays cast and crew had previously worked on the 2006 short film Devilwood, or the 2006 TV series Life on Mars. The film was shot in 16 days.

External links
 Official Website
 
 JAPANFilms
 BBC News Report
 Channel 4 Film Review

2008 films
2008 crime thriller films
2000s heist films
British crime thriller films
British heist films
2000s English-language films
Films set in the 1980s
Films directed by Sacha Bennett
2000s British films